GNSS reflectometry (or GNSS-R) involves making measurements from the reflections from the Earth of navigation signals from Global Navigation Satellite Systems such as GPS. The idea of using reflected GNSS signal for earth observation became more and more popular in the mid-1990s at NASA Langley Research Center and is also known as GPS reflectometry. Research applications of GNSS-R are found in

 Altimetry 
 Oceanography (Wave Height and Wind Speed)
 Cryosphere monitoring
 Soil moisture monitoring

GNSS reflectometry is passive sensing that takes advantage of and relies on separate active sources - the satellites generating the navigation signals. For this, the GNSS receiver measures the signal delay from the satellite (the pseudorange measurement) and the rate of change of the range between satellite and observer (the Doppler measurement). The surface area of the reflected GNSS signal also provides the two parameters time delay and frequency change. As a result, the Delay Doppler Map (DDM) can be obtained as GNSS-R observable. The shape and power distribution of the signal within the DDM is dictated by two reflecting surface conditions: its dielectric properties and its roughness state. Further derivation of geophysical information rely on these measurements.

GNSS reflectometry works as a bi-static radar, where transmitter and receiver are separated by a significant distance. Since in GNSS reflectometry one receiver simultaneously can track multiple transmitters (i.e. GNSS satellites), the system also has the nature of multi-static radar. The receiver of the reflected GNSS signal can be of different kinds: Ground stations, ship measurements, airplanes or satellites, like the UK-DMC satellite, part of the Disaster Monitoring Constellation built by Surrey Satellite Technology Ltd. It carried a secondary reflectometry payload that has demonstrated the feasibility of receiving and measuring GPS signals reflected from the surface of the Earth's oceans from its track in low Earth orbit to determine wave motion and windspeed.

See also 
 Cyclone Global Navigation Satellite System (CYGNSS)

References

Further reading 
 
 
Cardellach, Estel (2015): E-GEM – GNSS-R Earth Monitoring; State of the Art Description Document.
Emery, William and Camps, Adriano (2017): Introduction to Satellite Remote Sensing 1st Edition Atmosphere, Ocean, Land and Cryosphere Applications, Chapter 6:  Remote Sensing Using Global Navigation Satellite System Signals of Opportunity, Elsevier, 20th September 2017, Paperback , eBook  
 A complete list of references maintained by the GNSS-R Community can be found at: https://www.ice.csic.es/personal/rius/gnss_r_bibliography/index.html

External links 
 Reflecting on the future , The Engineer Online, 28 November 2006.
 GNSS Applications and Methods, Artech House, September 2009.

Satellite navigation
Remote sensing